The Vera C. Rubin Observatory, previously referred to as the Large Synoptic Survey Telescope (LSST), is an astronomical observatory currently under construction in Chile. Its main task will be carrying out a synoptic astronomical survey, the Legacy Survey of Space and Time (LSST). The word synoptic is derived from the Greek words σύν (syn "together") and ὄψις (opsis "view"), and describes observations that give a broad view of a subject at a particular time. The observatory is located on the El Peñón peak of Cerro Pachón, a 2,682-meter-high mountain in Coquimbo Region, in northern Chile, alongside the existing Gemini South and Southern Astrophysical Research Telescopes. The observatory is named for Vera Rubin, an American astronomer who pioneered discoveries about galaxy rotation rates.

The Rubin Observatory will house the Simonyi Survey Telescope, a wide-field reflecting telescope with an 8.4-meter primary mirror that will photograph the entire available sky every few nights. The telescope uses a novel three-mirror design, a variant of three-mirror anastigmat, which allows a compact telescope to deliver sharp images over a very wide 3.5-degree diameter field of view. Images will be recorded by a 3.2-gigapixel CCD imaging camera, the largest digital camera ever constructed.

The LSST was proposed in 2001, and construction of the mirror began (with private funds) in 2007.  LSST then became the top-ranked large ground-based project in the 2010 Astrophysics Decadal Survey, and 
the project officially began construction 1 August 2014 when the National Science Foundation (NSF) authorized the FY2014 portion ($27.5 million) of its construction budget. Funding comes from the NSF, the United States Department of Energy, and private funding raised by the dedicated international non-profit organization, the LSST Corporation. Operations are under the management of the Association of Universities for Research in Astronomy (AURA).

Site construction began on 14 April 2015 with the ceremonial laying of the first stone. First light for the engineering camera is expected in December 2023, while system first light is expected in July 2024 and full survey operations are aimed to begin in October 2024, due to COVID-related schedule delays. LSST data is scheduled to become fully public after two years.

Name 
In June 2019, the renaming of the Large Synoptic Survey Telescope (LSST) to the Vera C. Rubin Observatory was initiated by Rep. Eddie Bernice Johnson and Jenniffer González-Colón. The renaming was enacted into law on December 20, 2019. The official renaming was announced at the 2020 American Astronomical Society winter meeting. The observatory is named after Vera C. Rubin. The name honors Rubin and her  colleagues' legacy to probe the nature of dark matter by mapping and cataloging billions of galaxies through space and time.

The telescope will be named the Simonyi Survey Telescope, to acknowledge the private donors Charles and Lisa Simonyi.

History 

The LSST is the successor to a long tradition of sky surveys.  These started as visually compiled catalogs in the 18th century, such as the Messier catalog. This was replaced by photographic surveys, starting with the 1885 Harvard Plate Collection, the National Geographic Society – Palomar Observatory Sky Survey, and others. By about 2000, the first digital surveys, such as the Sloan Digital Sky Survey (SDSS), began to replace the photographic plates of the earlier surveys.

LSST evolved from the earlier concept of the Dark Matter Telescope,  mentioned as early as 1996. The fifth decadal report, Astronomy and Astrophysics in the New Millennium, was released in 2001, and recommended the "Large-Aperture Synoptic Survey Telescope" as a major initiative.  Even at this early stage the basic design and objectives were set:
The Large-aperture Synoptic Survey Telescope (LSST) is a 6.5-m-class optical telescope designed to survey the visible sky every week down to a much fainter level than that reached by existing surveys. It will catalog 90 percent of the near-Earth objects larger than 300 m and assess the threat they pose to life on Earth.  It will find some 10,000 primitive objects in the Kuiper Belt, which contains a fossil record of the formation of the solar system. It will also contribute to the study of the structure of the universe by observing thousands of supernovae, both nearby and at large redshift, and by measuring the distribution of dark matter through gravitational lensing. All the data will be available through the National Virtual Observatory... providing access for astronomers and the public to very deep images of the changing night sky.

Early development was funded by a number of small grants, with major contributions in January 2008 by software billionaires Charles and Lisa Simonyi and Bill Gates of $20- and $10 million respectively. $7.5 million was included in the U.S. President's FY2013 NSF budget request. The Department of Energy is  funding construction of the digital camera component by the SLAC National Accelerator Laboratory, as part of its mission to understand dark energy.

In the 2010 decadal survey, LSST was ranked as the highest-priority ground-based instrument.

NSF funding for the rest of construction was authorized as of 1 August 2014. The lead organizations are:
 The SLAC National Accelerator Laboratory to design and construct the LSST camera
 The National Optical Astronomy Observatory to provide the telescope and site team
 The National Center for Supercomputing Applications to construct and test the archive and data access center
 The Association of Universities for Research in Astronomy is responsible for overseeing the LSST construction.

, the project critical path was the camera installation, integration and testing.

In May 2018, Congress surprisingly appropriated much more funding than the telescope had asked for, in hopes of speeding up construction and operation.  Telescope management was thankful but unsure this would help, since at the late stage of construction they were not cash-limited.

Overview 
The Simonyi Survey Telescope design is unique among large telescopes (8 m-class primary mirrors) in having a very wide field of view: 3.5 degrees in diameter, or 9.6 square degrees. For comparison, both the Sun and the Moon, as seen from Earth, are 0.5 degrees across, or 0.2 square degrees. Combined with its large aperture (and thus light-collecting ability), this will give it a spectacularly large etendue of 319 m2∙degree2.  This is more than three times the etendue of the largest-view existing telescopes, the Subaru Telescope with its Hyper Suprime Camera and Pan-STARRS, and more than an order of magnitude better than most large telescopes.

Optics

The Simonyi Survey Telescope is the latest in a long line of improvements giving telescopes larger fields of view.  The earliest reflecting telescopes used spherical mirrors, which although easy to fabricate and test, suffer from spherical aberration; a very long focal length was needed to reduce spherical aberration to a tolerable level. Making the primary mirror parabolic removes spherical aberration on-axis, but the field of view is then limited by off-axis coma.  Such a parabolic primary, with either a prime or Cassegrain focus,  was the most common optical design up through the Hale telescope in 1949. After that, telescopes used mostly the Ritchey–Chrétien design, using two hyperbolic mirrors to remove both spherical aberration and coma, leaving only astigmatism, and giving a wider useful field of view. Most large telescopes since the Hale use this design—the Hubble and Keck telescopes are Ritchey–Chrétien, for example. LSST will use a three-mirror anastigmat to cancel astigmatism by employing three non-spherical mirrors. The result is sharp images over a very wide field of view, but at the expense of light-gathering power due to the large tertiary mirror.

The secondary mirror is expected to be the largest convex mirror in any operating telescope, until surpassed by the ELT's 4.2 m secondary in about 2024. Multiplying this by the field of view produces an étendue of 336 m2∙degree2; the actual figure is reduced by vignetting.

The primary and tertiary mirrors (M1 and M3) are designed as a single piece of glass, the "M1M3 monolith".  Placing the two mirrors in the same location minimizes the overall length of the telescope, making it easier to reorient quickly.  Making them out of the same piece of glass results in a stiffer structure than two separate mirrors, contributing to rapid settling after motion.

The optics includes three corrector lenses to reduce aberrations. These lenses, and the telescope's filters, are built into the camera assembly. The first lens at 1.55 m diameter is the largest lens ever built, and the third lens forms the vacuum window in front of the focal plane.

Unlike many telescopes, the Rubin Observatory makes no attempt to compensate for dispersion in the atmosphere.  Such correction, which requires re-adjusting an additional element in the optical train, would be very difficult in the 5 seconds allowed between pointings, plus is a technical challenge due to the extremely short focal length.  As a result, shorter wavelength bands away from the zenith will have somewhat reduced image quality.

Camera 

A 3.2-gigapixel prime focus digital camera will take a 15-second exposure every 20 seconds. Repointing such a large telescope (including settling time) within 5 seconds requires an exceptionally short and stiff structure. This in turn implies a very small f-number, which requires very precise focusing of the camera.

The 15-second exposures are a compromise to allow spotting both faint and moving sources.  Longer exposures would reduce the overhead of camera readout and telescope re-positioning, allowing deeper imaging, but then fast moving objects such as near-Earth objects would move significantly during an exposure.  Each spot on the sky is imaged with two consecutive 15 second exposures, to efficiently reject cosmic ray hits on the CCDs.

The camera focal plane is flat and 64 cm in diameter. The main imaging is performed by a mosaic of 189 CCD detectors, each with 16 megapixels. They are grouped into a 5×5 grid of "rafts", where the central 21 rafts contain 3×3 imaging sensors, while the four corner rafts contain only three CCDs each, for guiding and focus control.

The camera includes a filter located between the second and third lenses, and an automatic filter-changing mechanism. Although the camera has six filters (ugrizy) covering 330 to 1080 nm wavelengths, the camera's position between the secondary and tertiary mirrors limits the size of its filter changer. It can only hold five filters at a time, so each day one of the six must be chosen to be omitted for the following night.

Image data processing

Allowing for maintenance, bad weather and other contingencies, the camera is expected to take over 200,000 pictures (1.28 petabytes uncompressed) per year, far more than can be reviewed by humans. Managing and effectively analyzing the enormous output of the telescope is expected to be the most technically difficult part of the project. In 2010, the initial computer requirements were estimated at 100 teraflops of computing power and 15 petabytes of storage, rising as the project collects data.  By 2018, estimates had risen to 250 teraflops and 100 petabytes of storage.

Once images are taken, they are processed according to three different timescales, prompt (within 60 seconds), daily, and annually.

The prompt products are alerts, issued within 60 seconds of observation, about objects that have changed brightness or position relative to archived images of that sky position. Transferring, processing, and differencing such large images within 60 seconds (previous methods took hours, on smaller images) is a significant software engineering problem by itself.  Approximately 10 million alerts will be generated per night.   Each alert will include the following:
 Alert and database ID: IDs uniquely identifying this alert
 The photometric, astrometric, and shape characterization of the detected source
 30×30 pixel (on average) cut-outs of the template and difference images (in FITS format)
 The time series (up to a year) of all previous detections of this source
 Various summary statistics ("features") computed of the time series
There is no proprietary period associated with alerts—they are available to the public immediately, since the goal is to quickly transmit nearly everything LSST knows about any given event, enabling downstream classification and decision making. LSST will generate an unprecedented rate of alerts, hundreds per second when the telescope is operating.  Most observers will be interested in only a tiny fraction of these events, so the alerts will be fed to "event brokers" which forward subsets to interested parties.  LSST will provide a simple broker, and provide the full alert stream to external event brokers.  The Zwicky Transient Facility will serve as a prototype of LSST system, generating 1 million alerts per night.

Daily  products, released within 24 hours of observation, comprise the images from that night, and the source catalogs derived from difference images.  This includes orbital parameters for Solar System objects. Images will be available in two forms:  Raw Snaps, or data straight from the camera, and Single Visit Images, which have been processed and include instrumental signature removal (ISR), background estimation, source detection, deblending and measurements, point spread function estimation, and astrometric and photometric calibration.

Annual release data products will be made available once a year, by re-processing the entire science data set to date. These include:
Calibrated images
Measurements of positions, fluxes, and shapes
Variability information
A compact description of light curves
A uniform reprocessing of the difference-imaging-based prompt data products
A catalog of roughly 6 million Solar Systems objects, with their orbits
A catalog of approximately 37 billion sky objects (20 billion galaxies and 17 billion stars), each with more than 200 attributes
The annual release will be computed partially by NCSA, and partially by IN2P3 in France.

LSST is reserving 10% of its computing power and disk space for user generated data products.  These will be produced by running custom algorithms over the LSST data set for specialized purposes, using APIs to access the data and store the results. This avoids the need to download, then upload, huge quantities of data by allowing users to use the LSST storage and computation capacity directly.  It also allows academic groups to have different release policies than LSST as a whole.

An early version of the LSST image data processing software is being used by the Subaru Telescope's Hyper Suprime-Cam instrument, a wide-field survey instrument with a sensitivity similar to LSST but one fifth the field of view: 1.8 square degrees versus the 9.6 square degrees of LSST.

Scientific goals 

LSST will cover about 18,000 deg2 of the southern sky with 6 filters in its main survey, with about 825 visits to each spot. The 5σ (SNR greater than 5) magnitude limits are expected to be r<24.5 in single images, and r<27.8 in the full stacked data.

The main survey will use about 90% of the observing time. The remaining 10% will be used to obtain improved coverage for specific goals and regions. This includes very deep (r ∼ 26) observations, very short revisit times (roughly one minute), observations of "special" regions such as the ecliptic, galactic plane, and the Large and Small Magellanic Clouds, and areas covered in detail by multi-wavelength surveys such as COSMOS and the Chandra Deep Field South.  Combined, these special programs will increase the total area to about 25,000 deg2.

Particular scientific goals of the LSST include:
 Studying dark energy and dark matter by measuring weak gravitational lensing, baryon acoustic oscillations, and photometry of type Ia supernovae, all as a function of redshift.
 Mapping small objects in the Solar System, particularly near-Earth asteroids and Kuiper belt objects. LSST is expected to increase the number of cataloged objects by a factor of 10–100. It will also help with the search for the hypothesized Planet Nine.
 Detecting transient astronomical events including novae, supernovae, gamma-ray bursts, quasar variability, and gravitational lensing, and providing prompt event notifications to facilitate follow-up.
 Mapping the Milky Way.

Because of its wide field of view and high sensitivity, LSST is expected to be among the best prospects for detecting optical counterparts to gravitational wave events detected by LIGO and other observatories.

It is also hoped that the vast volume of data produced will lead to additional serendipitous discoveries.

NASA has been tasked by the US Congress with detecting and cataloging 90% of the NEO population of size 140 meters or greater. LSST, by itself, is estimated to be capable of detecting 62% of such objects, and according to the National Academy of Sciences, extending its survey from ten years to twelve would be the most cost-effective way of finishing the task.

Rubin Observatory has a program of Education and Public Outreach (EPO).  Rubin Observatory EPO will serve four main categories of users: the general public, formal educators, citizen science principal investigators, and content developers at informal science education facilities.  Rubin Observatory will partner with Zooniverse for a number of their citizen science projects.

Comparison with other sky surveys 

There have been many other optical sky surveys, some still on-going.  For comparison, here are some of the main currently used optical surveys, with differences noted:
Photographic sky surveys, such as the National Geographic Society – Palomar Observatory Sky Survey and its digitized version, the Digitized Sky Survey.  This technology is obsolete, with much less depth, and in general taken from locations with less than excellent views.  However, these archives are still used since they span a rather large time interval—more than 100 years in some cases—and cover the entire sky. The plate scans reached a limit of R~18 and B~19.5 over 90% of the sky, and about one magnitude fainter over 50% of the sky.
The Sloan Digital Sky Survey (SDSS) (2000–2009) surveyed 14,555 square degrees of the northern hemisphere sky with a 2.5 meter telescope.  It continues to the present day as a spectrographic survey. Its limiting photometric magnitude ranged from 20.5 to 22.2, depending on the filter.
Pan-STARRS (2010–present) is an ongoing sky survey using two wide-field 1.8 m Ritchey–Chrétien telescopes located at Haleakala in Hawaii.  Until LSST begins operation, it will remain the best detector of near-Earth objects.  Its coverage, 30,000 square degrees, is comparable to what LSST will cover. The single image depth in the PS1 survey was between magnitude 20.9-22.0 depending on filter.
The DESI Legacy Imaging Surveys (2013–present) looks at 14,000 square degrees of the northern and southern sky with the Bok 2.3-m telescope, the 4-meter Mayall telescope and the 4-meter Víctor M. Blanco Telescope. The Legacy Surveys make use of the Mayall z-band Legacy Survey, the Beijing–Arizona Sky Survey and the Dark Energy Survey. The Legacy Surveys avoided the Milky Way since it was primarily concerned with distant galaxies. The area of DES (5,000 square degrees) is entirely contained within the anticipated survey area of LSST in the southern sky. Its exposures typically reach magnitude 23-24.
Gaia is an ongoing space-based survey of the entire sky since 2014, whose primary goal is extremely precise astrometry of roughly two billion stars, quasars, galaxies and sun system objects. Its collecting area of 0.7 m2 does not allow observation of objects as faint as can be included in other surveys, but the location of each object observed is known with far greater precision. While not taking exposures in the traditional sense, it detects objects up to a magnitude of 21.
The Zwicky Transient Facility (2018–present) is a similar, rapid, wide-field survey to detect transient events.  The telescope has an even larger field of view (47 square degrees; 5× the field), but a significantly smaller aperture (1.22 m; 1/ the area).  It is being used to develop and test the LSST automated alert software. Its exposures typically reach magnitude 20-21.
The Space Surveillance Telescope (2011–present) is a similar rapid wide-field survey telescope used primarily for military applications, with secondary civil applications including space debris and NEO detection and cataloguing.

Construction progress 

The Cerro Pachón site was selected in 2006. The main factors were the number of clear nights per year, seasonal weather patterns, and the quality of images as seen through the local atmosphere (seeing). The site also needed to have an existing observatory infrastructure, to minimize costs of construction, and access to fiber optic links, to accommodate the 30 terabytes of data LSST will produce each night.

As of February 2018, construction was well underway. The shell of the summit building is complete, and 2018 saw the installation of major equipment, including HVAC, the dome, mirror coating chamber, and the telescope mount assembly. It also saw the expansion of the AURA base facility in La Serena and the summit dormitory shared with other telescopes on the mountain.

By February 2018, the camera and telescope shared the critical path. The main risk was deemed to be whether sufficient time was allotted for system integration.

 the project remained within budget, although the budget contingency was tight.

In March 2020, work on the summit facility, and the main camera at SLAC, was suspended due to the COVID-19 pandemic, though work on software continued. During this time, the commissioning camera arrived at the base facility and is being tested there. It will be moved to the summit when it is safe to do so.

Mirrors
The primary mirror, the most critical and time-consuming part of a large telescope's construction, was made over a 7-year period by the University of Arizona's Steward Observatory Mirror Lab. Construction of the mold began in November 2007, mirror casting was begun in March 2008, and the mirror blank was declared "perfect" at the beginning of September 2008. In January 2011, both M1 and M3 figures had completed generation and fine grinding, and polishing had begun on M3.

The mirror was formally accepted on 13 February 2015, then placed in the mirror transport box and stored in an airplane hangar. In October 2018, it was moved back to the mirror lab and integrated with the mirror support cell. It went through additional testing in January/February 2019, then was returned to its shipping crate. In March 2019, it was sent by truck to Houston, was placed on a ship for delivery to Chile, and arrived on the summit in May.  There it will be re-united with the mirror support cell and coated.

The coating chamber, which was used to coat the mirrors once they arrived, itself arrived at the summit in November 2018.

The secondary mirror was manufactured by Corning of ultra low expansion glass and coarse-ground to within 40 μm of the desired shape. In November 2009, the blank was shipped to Harvard University for storage until funding to complete it was available. On 21 October 2014, the secondary mirror blank was delivered from Harvard to Exelis (now a subsidiary of Harris Corporation) for fine grinding.  The completed mirror was delivered to Chile on 7 December 2018, and was coated in July 2019.

Building

Site excavation began in earnest on 8 March 2011, and the site had been leveled by the end of 2011. Also during that time, the design progressed, with significant improvements to the mirror support system, stray-light baffles, wind screen, and calibration screen.

In 2015, a large amount of broken rock and clay was found under the site of the support building adjacent to the telescope.  This caused a 6-week construction delay while it was dug out and the space filled with concrete.  This did not affect the telescope proper or its dome, whose much more important foundations were examined more thoroughly during site planning.

The building was declared substantially complete in March 2018. The dome was expected to be complete in August 2018, but a picture from May 2019 showed it still incomplete.  The (still incomplete) Rubin Observatory dome first rotated under its own power in November 2019.

Telescope mount assembly

The telescope mount, and the pier on which it sits, are substantial engineering projects in their own right.  The main technical problem is that the telescope must slew 3.5 degrees to the adjacent field and settle within four seconds.  This requires a very stiff pier and telescope mount, with very high speed slew and acceleration (10°/sec and 10°/sec2, respectively).  The basic design is conventional: an altitude over azimuth mount made of steel, with hydrostatic bearings on both axes, mounted on a pier which is isolated from the dome foundations.  However, the LSST pier is unusually large (16 m diameter) and robust (1.25 m thick walls), and mounted directly to virgin bedrock, where care was taken during site excavation to avoid using explosives that would crack it.  Other unusual design features are linear motors on the main axes and a recessed floor on the mount.  This allows the telescope to extend slightly below the azimuth bearings, giving it a very low center of gravity.

The contract for the Telescope Mount Assembly was signed in August 2014.  It passed its acceptance tests in 2018 and arrived at the construction site in September 2019.

Camera construction
In August 2015, the LSST Camera project, which is separately funded by the U.S. Department of Energy, passed its "critical decision 3" design review, with the review committee recommending DoE formally approve start of construction.  On August 31, the approval was given, and construction began at SLAC.  As of September 2017, construction of the camera was 72% complete, with sufficient funding in place (including contingencies) to finish the project.  By September 2018, the cryostat was complete, the lenses ground, and 12 of the 21 needed rafts of CCD sensors had been delivered. As of September 2020, the entire focal plane was complete and undergoing testing.  By October 2021, the last of the six filters needed by the camera had been finished and delivered.  By November 2021, the entire camera had been cooled down to its required operating temperature, so final testing could begin.

Before the final camera is installed, a smaller and simpler version (the Commissioning Camera, or ComCam) will be used "to perform early telescope alignment and commissioning tasks, complete engineering first light, and possibly produce early usable science data".

Data transport
The data must be transported from the camera, to facilities at the summit, to the base facilities, and then to the LSST Data Facility at the National Center for Supercomputing Applications in the United States. This transfer must be very fast (100 Gbit/s or better) and reliable since NCSA is where the data will be processed into scientific data products, including real-time alerts of transient events. This transfer uses multiple fiber optic cables from the base facility in La Serena to Santiago, then via two redundant routes to Miami, where it connects to existing high speed infrastructure. These two redundant links were activated in March 2018 by the AmLight consortium.

Since the data transfer crosses international borders, many different groups are involved. These include the Association of Universities for Research in Astronomy (AURA, Chile and the USA), REUNA (Chile), Florida International University (USA), AmLightExP (USA), RNP (Brazil), and University of Illinois Urbana-Champaign NCSA (USA), all of which participate in the LSST Network Engineering Team (NET). This collaboration designs and delivers end-to-end network performance across multiple network domains and providers.

Possible impact of satellite constellations 
A study in 2020 by the European Southern Observatory estimated that up to 30% to 50% of the exposures around twilight with the Rubin Observatory would be severely affected by satellite constellations. Survey telescopes have a large field of view and they study short-lived phenomena like supernova or asteroids, and mitigation methods that work on other telescopes may be less effective. The images would be affected especially during twilight (50%) and at the beginning and end of the night (30%). For bright trails the complete exposure could be ruined by a combination of saturation, crosstalk (far away pixels gaining signal due to the nature of CCD electronics), and ghosting (internal reflections within the telescope and camera) caused by the satellite trail, affecting an area of the sky significantly larger than the satellite path itself during imaging. For fainter trails only a quarter of the image would be lost.  A previous study by the Rubin Observatory found an impact of 40% at twilight and only nights in the middle of the winter would be unaffected.

Possible approaches to this problem would be a reduction of the number or brightness of satellites, upgrades to the telescope's CCD camera system, or both. Observations of Starlink satellites showed a decrease of the satellite trail brightness for darkened satellites.  This decrease is however not enough to mitigate the effect on wide-field surveys like the one conducted by the Rubin Observatory.  Therefore SpaceX is introducing a sunshade on newer satellites, to keep the portions of the satellite visible from the ground out of direct sunlight.  The objective is to keep the satellites below 7th magnitude, to avoid saturating the detectors.  This limits the problem to only the trail of the satellite and not the whole image.

Gallery

Notes

See also 

 List of largest optical reflecting telescopes
 Pan-STARRS
 Dark Energy Survey
 VISTA (Visible and Infrared Survey Telescope for Astronomy)
 VLT Survey Telescope

References

External links 

 
 Legacy Survey of Space and Time official website
 LSST construction site webcams
 LSST reports and documentation
 New Scientist SPACE Article
 LSST Tutorials for Experimental Particle Physicists is a detailed explanation of LSST's design (as of February 2006) and weak lensing science goals that does not assume a lot of astronomy background.
 The New Digital Sky is a video of a July 25, 2006 presentation at Google about the LSST, particularly the data management issues.
 HULIQ Google participation announcement
 , an updated and expanded overview.

Large Synoptic Survey Telescope
Optical telescopes
Buildings and structures under construction in Chile
Telescopes under construction
Astronomical observatories in Chile
Astronomical surveys
Buildings and structures in Coquimbo Region
NOIRLab